Salem Township is a township in Cowley County, Kansas, USA.  As of the 2000 census, its population was 364.

Geography
According to the USGS, it contains one cemetery, New Salem. The man-made Timber Creek Lake occupies the central portion of the township.

References
 USGS Geographic Names Information System (GNIS)

External links
 City-Data.com

Townships in Cowley County, Kansas
Townships in Kansas